Intimate Enemies is a 2015 South Korean film written and directed by Im Sang-soo.

Plot
Tow truck driver Na-mi, corporate intern Ji-noo, African worker Yakubu and his Korean wife Jung-sook discover bags full of cash at the site of a car crash, which is actually the slush fund of a conglomerate president. They initially pocket the money, but when the president sends ruthless criminals after them, they decide to use it to mete out revenge on corrupt corporations.

Cast
Ryoo Seung-bum as Ji-noo
Go Joon-hee as Na-mi
Ryu Hyun-kyung as Jung-sook
Sam Okyere as Yakubu
Kim Eung-soo as In-soo
Jung Won-joong as Sang-ho 
Yang Ik-june as Eumbuki 
Kim Hyung-gyu as Chang-joon
Youn Yuh-jung as Yeo-jung (cameo)
Kim Joo-hyuk as Chairman (cameo)
Kim C (cameo)
Moon Ji-ae (cameo)
Chang Kiha & The Faces (cameo)

References

External links
 

2015 films
South Korean action comedy films
2010s Korean-language films
20th Century Fox films
Films directed by Im Sang-soo
2010s South Korean films